John Patrick Morris (1894 - 31 July 1962) was a British Conservative Party politician who served as the Member of Parliament (MP) for Salford North from 1931 until 1945. He was educated at secondary school in Bolton, saw active service with the Royal Engineers in the First World War, and was a member of the London Stock Exchange and Manchester Stock Exchange. He is noted for highlighting the persecution of the Jews in pre-war Nazi Germany, having brought up the issue in the House of Commons in 1933.

References

External links 
 

Conservative Party (UK) MPs for English constituencies
UK MPs 1931–1935
1894 births
1962 deaths
Politics of Salford
UK MPs 1935–1945
Members of the Parliament of the United Kingdom for Salford North